Dong Yifan (Chinese: 董一凡; born 8 March 1992), former name Yi Fan, is a Chinese football player who currently plays for China League One side Guangxi Pingguo Haliao.

Club career
In 2010, Yi Fan started his professional footballer career with Changchun Yatai in the Chinese Super League.  On 7 February 2013, Yi was loaned to China League Two side Lijiang Jiayunhao until 31 December 2014. On 21 August 2016, Yi made his debut for Changchun in the 2016 Chinese Super League against Yanbian Funde.

Career statistics 

Statistics accurate as of match played 25 November 2022.

References

External links
 

1992 births
Living people
Chinese footballers
Footballers from Heilongjiang
Changchun Yatai F.C. players
Yunnan Flying Tigers F.C. players
Chinese Super League players
China League Two players
China League One players
Association football goalkeepers
Guangxi Pingguo Haliao F.C. players